Clemente Canepari (11 November 1886 – 13 September 1966) was an Italian racing cyclist. He finished in fourth place in the 1909 Giro d'Italia.

References

External links
 

1886 births
1966 deaths
Italian male cyclists
Cyclists from the Province of Pavia